Miro Cerar may refer to:
 Miroslav Cerar Sr. (born 1938), Slovenian lawyer, gymnast and Olympic gold medalist and father of Miroslav Cerar Jr.
 Miroslav Cerar Jr. (born 1963), Slovenian lawyer and politician, son of Miroslav Cerar Sr.